Boxer is a 1984 Indian Hindi-language sports film directed by Raj N. Sippy, starring Mithun Chakraborty, Rati Agnihotri, Sharat Saxena, Danny Denzongpa, and Tanuja.

Plot
Dharma works as a boxer with Kashmir Silk Mills. The managing director is very pleased with him, and assures him that if he will win the next boxing bout against Shera, he will be sent to London. Unfortunately, Dharma loses the bout, he is grievously injured, unable to box anymore, and shortly thereafter, he is fired from his job. Thereafter an embittered Dharma takes to drinking alcohol in a big way, ignoring his pregnant wife, Savitri, & young son, Shankar. Things get worse when Savitri gives birth to a second baby boy, Sonu. Then in order to make ends meet, Shankar takes to stealing, and hiding from the law. Years later, Shankar, now a career criminal, is arrested for stealing a watch from a man coming out of a jewellery store, he is tried in court and sentenced to jail for 6 months. In prison, he meets with boxing manager, Tony Braganza, and after his release, he starts to train with him and eventually challenges the reigning Champion Raghu Raj.

Music

Cast

Mithun Chakraborty as Shankar
Rati Agnihotri as Rajni
Danny Denzongpa as Dharma
Tanuja as Savitri
Parikshit Sahni as Tony Braganza
Sujit Kumar as Inspector Khatau
Naaz as Mrs. Khatau
Iftekhar as Rushie
Sudhir as Gafoor
Sharat Saxena as Raghuraj
Raju Shrestha as Young Shankar
Yusuf Khan as Jail Inmate Rival of Shankar

References

External links
 

1984 films
1980s Hindi-language films
Indian sports films
Films scored by R. D. Burman
Indian boxing films
Films directed by Raj N. Sippy
1980s sports films
Hindi-language action films